Reaching Hypercritical is the fifth and final studio album by American post-hardcore band Palisades. The album was released on July 22, 2022, by Rise Records.

Release 
On December 1, 2021, the band announced that vocalist Louis Miceli Jr. would be leaving the band. Bassist Brandon Elgar then became lead vocalist. Shortly afterwards, after three years of no music, they released the new song "My Consequences" on December 6, 2021. On March 11, 2022, they released the single "Better" and announced the album.

The album was written during a tough time for the band, and members of the band said of the writing process of the album:

Musical style
Tamara May of Wall of Sound said that the single "Better" is "a soaring emo anthem, through its magnificent melodies and vulnerable lyrics that flow together ever so seamlessly. New listeners of the band will immediately feel similarities to Sleeping With Sirens and Issues."

Track listing

Personnel
Palisades
 Brandon Elgar – bass guitar, lead vocals
 Xavier Adames – lead guitar, backing vocals
 Matthew Marshall – rhythm guitar
 Aaron Rosa – drums, percussion

References

2022 albums
Palisades (band) albums
Rise Records albums